Charles Henry Goren (March 4, 1901 – April 3, 1991) was an American bridge player and writer who significantly developed and popularized the game. He was the leading American bridge personality in the 1950s and 1960s – or 1940s and 1950s, as "Mr. Bridge" – as Ely Culbertson had been in the 1930s. Culbertson, Goren, and Harold Vanderbilt were the three people named when The Bridge World inaugurated a bridge "hall of fame" in 1964 and they were made founding members of the ACBL Hall of Fame in 1995.

According to New York Times bridge columnist Alan Truscott, more than 10 million copies of Goren's books were sold. Among them, Point-Count Bidding (1949) "pushed the great mass of bridge players into abandoning Ely Culbertson's clumsy and inaccurate honor-trick method of valuation."

Goren's widely syndicated newspaper column "Goren on Bridge" first appeared in the Chicago Tribune August 30 1944, p.15.

Early years

Goren was born in Philadelphia, Pennsylvania, to Russian Jewish immigrants.  He earned a law degree at McGill University in Montreal in 1923. While he was attending McGill, a girlfriend (or "a young hostess") laughed at his ineptness at the game of bridge, motivating him to immerse himself in a study of existing bridge materials. (The young hostess laughed in 1922. The game was auction bridge, "which became contract bridge later in the decade".)

When he graduated, he was admitted to the Pennsylvania bar and he practiced law for 13 years in Philadelphia. The growing fame of Ely Culbertson, however, prompted Goren to abandon his original career choice to pursue bridge competitions, where he attracted the attention of Milton Work. Work hired Goren to help with his bridge articles and columns, and eventually Goren began ghostwriting Work's material.

Work was one of numerous strong bridge players based in Philadelphia around the 1920s. He became an extraordinarily successful lecturer and writer on the game and perhaps the first who came to be called its "Grand Old Man". From 1928, he had popularized the 4–3–2–1 point count system for evaluating balanced hands (now sometimes called the Work count, Work point count, or Work points). His chief assistant Olive Peterson and young Goren established a partnership as players.

Work was the greatest authority on auction bridge, which was generally replaced by contract bridge during the late 1920s. Goren "became Mr. Work's technical assistant at the end of the decade".

As a player Goren's "breakthrough" was the 1937 Board-a-Match Teams championship (now Reisinger) won with three other Philadelphia players: John Crawford, Charles Solomon, and Sally Young.

His breakthrough as a writer may have been when Culbertson moved a newspaper bridge column from one syndicate to another. The Chicago Tribune and the Daily News of New York picked up Goren. 

Goren dominated the competitive bridge circuit until about 1962 after which he focused on writing and teaching bridge

Bridge contributions

After Milton Work died in 1934, Goren began his own bridge writing career and published the first of his many books on playing bridge, Winning Bridge Made Easy, in 1936.  Drawing on his experience with Work's system, Goren quickly became popular as an instructor and lecturer. His subsequent lifetime of contributions to the game have made him one of the most important figures in the history of bridge.

Goren became world champion at the Bermuda Bowl in 1950. Goren's books have sold millions of copies (especially Winning Bridge Made Easy and Contract Bridge Complete); by 1958 his daily bridge column was appearing in 194 American newspapers. He also had a monthly column in McCall's and a weekly column in Sports Illustrated.

His television program, Championship Bridge with Charles Goren, was broadcast from 1959 to 1964 on the ABC network. It featured numerous appearances by top players and segments with celebrity guests such as Chico Marx, Alfred Drake, and Forest Evashevski, among others.

Goren's longest partnership was with Helen Sobel, but he also famously partnered actor Omar Sharif. Sharif also wrote introductions to or co-authored several of Goren's bridge books, and was also co-author of Goren's newspaper column, eventually taking it over in collaboration with Tannah Hirsch.

Point count system

As he continued writing, Goren began to develop his point count system, based on the Milton Work point count, as an improvement over the existing system of counting "honor tricks". Goren, with assistance, formulated a method of combining the Work count, which was based entirely on high cards, and various distributional features. This may well have improved the bidding of intermediate players and beginners almost immediately.

Four-card suits

Goren also worked to continue the practice of  opening four-card suits, with an occasional three-card club suit when the only four-card suit was a weak . In this, he was following the practice established by Ely Culbertson in the early 1930s. Later on, he continued this practice, resisting the well-known five-card majors approach that has become a major feature of modern Standard American bidding.

Opening a four-card suit can improve the chances of the partnership identifying a four-four trump fit, and the four-card approach is still used by experts today, notably by most Acol players. It is claimed that the drawback of the four-card approach is that the Law of Total Tricks is more difficult to apply in cases where it is used. However, the five-card majors approach became popular before the Law of Total Tricks was propounded.

Other contributions

In addition to his pioneering work in bringing simple and effective bridge to everyday players, Goren also worked to popularize the Precision bidding method, which is one of many so-called big club or strong club systems (which use an opening bid of one club to indicate a strong hand).

Tribune Content Agency distributes the daily column Goren Bridge, written by Bob Jones, using the Goren method.

Legacy

Goren died on April 3, 1991, in Encino, California, at the age of 90. He had lived with his nephew Marvin Goren for 19 years. While few players "play Goren" exactly today, the point-count approach he popularized remains the foundation for most bidding systems.

During the month of Goren's death, Truscott followed his obituary with a bridge column entitled, "Goren leaves behind many fans and a column with an international flavor". His business interests had been "managed by others" since his retirement "a quarter of a century ago", according to Truscott. "The Goren syndicated column now has an international flavor: It carries the bylines of the movie star Omar Sharif, an Egyptian who lives in Paris, and an entrepreneur, Tannah Hirsch, a South African who came to the United States via Israel."

Goren appeared on the Groucho Marx radio and television game show You Bet Your Life in March 1958.

Goren appeared on the television game show What’s My Line in December 1961.

Bridge accomplishments

Honors

 ACBL Hall of Fame, 1964

 ACBL Honorary Member of the Year, 1959

Awards
 McKenney Trophy 1937, 1943, 1945, 1947, 1948, 1949, 1950, 1951
 Precision Award (Best Article or Series on a System or Convention) 1974

Wins
 Bermuda Bowl (1) 1950
 North American Bridge Championships (32)
 Vanderbilt (2) 1944, 1945
 Asbury Park Trophy (now Spingold) (1) 1937
 Spingold (5) 1943, 1947, 1951, 1956, 1960
 Chicago (now Reisinger) (8) 1937, 1938, 1939, 1942, 1943, 1950, 1957, 1963
 Men's Board-a-Match Teams (1) 1952
 Master Mixed Teams (6) 1938, 1941, 1943, 1944, 1948, 1954
 Life Master Pairs (2) 1942, 1958
 Fall National Open Pairs (1) 1940
 Men's Pairs (3) 1938, 1943, 1949
 Rockwell Mixed Pairs (1) 1947
 Hilliard Mixed Pairs (1) 1943
 Master Individual (1) 1945

Runners-up
 Bermuda Bowl (2) 1956, 1957
 North American Bridge Championships (21)
 Vanderbilt (8) 1934, 1936, 1949, 1950, 1953, 1955, 1959, 1962
 Spingold (2) 1939, 1950
 Chicago (now Reisinger) (2) 1944, 1951
 Men's Board-a-Match Teams (2) 1946, 1955
 Master Mixed Teams (4) 1946, 1949, 1950, 1951
 Life Master Pairs (1) 1953
 Men's Pairs (1) 1935
 Hilliard Mixed Pairs (1) 1934

Publications

 Winning Bridge Made Easy: a simplified self-teaching method of contract bidding combining all the principles of the new Culbertson system with the principal features of the four aces system (Harrisburg, PA: The Telegraph Press, 1936), 92 pp., 
 Better Bridge for Better Players: the play of the cards, introduction by Ely Culbertson, foreword by George S. Kaufman (Doubleday, Doran, 1942), 538 pp. ; also known as The Standard Book of Play: better bridge for better players, 
 The earliest British edition in WorldCat records is Better Bridge for Better Players: the standard book of play, intro. Culbertson, fwd. Kauffman (London: Walter Edwards, 1947), 
 The Standard Book of Bidding (Doubleday, 1944), 299 pp. ; (Doubleday, 1947), 310 pp. 
 Contract Bridge in a Nutshell (Doubleday, 1946), 128 pp. ;  at least seven editions to 1986 under the titles Contract Bridge in a Nutshell [CBN], New CBN, Goren's New CBN, or Charles Goren's New CBN 
 Contract Bridge Made Easy, a self-teacher (Doubleday, 1948), 95 pp. – "Replaces the author's Winning bridge made easy, first pub. in 1936 and now out of print." 
  First London edition published by Eyre & Spottiswoode in 1951. Title has been revised and reprinted numerous times to 1984.
 . First London edition published by Eyre & Spottiswoode in 1959. Title has been reprinted numerous times to 1972.
 with Jack Olsen: . Paperback editions published by Cornerstone Library, NY in 1967 and 1970, pp. 190.

100 Challenging Bridge Hands
An Entirely New Bridge Summary
The A.B.C.'s of Contract Bridge
Championship Bridge with Charles Goren
Charles H. Goren's Bridge Quiz Book
Contract Bridge Complete
Easy Steps: Eight Steps to Winning Bridge
The Elements of Bridge
The Fundamental of contract Bridge
Goren on Play and Defense: All of Play: The Technique, the Logic, and the Challenge of Master Bridge
Goren Presents the Italian Bridge System
Goren Settles the Bridge Arguments
Goren's Bridge Complete
Goren's Bridge Quizzes
Goren's Hoyle Encyclopedia of Bridge
Goren's New Contract Bridge Complete
Goren's Point Count Bidding Made Easy
Goren's Winning Partnership Bridge
Introduction to Bridge
Introduction to Competitive Bidding
 Modern Backgammon Complete
Official Charles Goren Quick Reference to Winning Bridge
Play and Defense
Play As You Learn Bridge
Play Bridge With Goren
Play Winning Bridge With Any Partner: Even a Stranger
Precision Bridge for Everyone
The Precision System of Bidding
Precision System of Contract Bridge Bidding: Charles H. Goren Presents
Sports Illustrated Book of Bridge

Notes

References

Citations

External links
 
 
 
 King of the Aces Time magazine (1958)
 Profile on bridgehands.com
 Turning Tricks: The Rise and Fall of Contract Bridge, by David Owen in The New Yorker
 Charles Goren, biography on bridgebum.com
 Charles Goren on the television program "What's My Line?"
 

1901 births
1991 deaths
American contract bridge players
Bermuda Bowl players
American instructional writers
Contract bridge writers
American people of Russian-Jewish descent
Writers from Philadelphia
20th-century American non-fiction writers
McGill University Faculty of Law alumni
Central High School (Philadelphia) alumni